Tin Shui Wai Government Secondary School or TSWGSS was established in 1990. It is located in Tin Yiu Estate in Tin Shui Wai, a part of Hong Kong. Having adopted the policy of inclusive education, it is a co-educational grammar school. TSWGSS is a nominated secondary school of Tin Shui Wai Government Primary School.

TSWGSS was first built in Au Tau in Yuen Long in 1990. It has moved to Tin Shui Wai since 1992. Medium of instruction in junior forms had been switched from English to Chinese starting from September 1998. The TSWGSS campus is next to Yuen Long Lutheran Secondary School, which shares the same location in parts of TSWGSS.

References

Secondary schools in Hong Kong